Sihora is a town and a municipality in Jabalpur district in the Indian state of Madhya Pradesh. The first cooperative society in madhya pradesh state was established in Sihora block of Jabalpur district in 1904.

Sihora was a Princely State and ruled by Koli chieftains. the rulers of sihora were direct descendants of Koli chief Bapuji Makwana.

Demographics
According to the 2011 India census, Sihora had a population of 44048; Males constitute 52% of the population and females 48%. Sihora has an average literacy rate of 68%, higher than the national average of 59.5%: male literacy is 75%, and female literacy is 59%. In Sihora, 15% of the population is under 6 years of age.

Notable people 
Kashi Prasad Pandey represented Sihora Vidhan Sabha constituency of undivided Madhya Pradesh Legislative Assembly by winning General election of 1957.

References

Cities and towns in Jabalpur district